Apulia and Calabria was a Late Roman province in the ancient territories of Apulia and Calabria (both included in the modern Apulia region, in southern Italy). Its capital was Canusium (modern Canosa di Puglia).

See also
 County of Apulia and Calabria

Apulia and Calabria